is a former member of multiple Japanese idol girl groups. She is a former member of NMB48's Team BII, and a former member of SKE48's Team S. She was also on AKB48 Team B.

Career 
Watanabe passed NMB48's first-generation auditions on 20 September 2010, and debuted on 9 October the same year. Her theater debut was on 1 January 2011.

On 10 March 2011, she was selected to form NMB48's Team N. Watanabe and Sayaka Yamamoto were chosen as a senbatsu member for AKB48's 21st single "Everyday, Katyusha". Watanabe held an AKB48 Team B concurrent position from March 2012 to April 2014. Following that, she has a concurrent position in SKE48's Team S since April 2014.

In AKB48's 2013 general elections, Watanabe placed 15th. In AKB48's Janken Tournament in 2014, she won first place, and had a solo debut. Her first solo single, "Yasashiku Suru Yori Kiss o Shite", was released on 24 December 2014.

On March 26, 2015, it was announced that her concurrent position in SKE48 would be canceled.
On April 13, 2016, she announced her graduation.
On July 3 to 4, 2016, Watanabe's graduation concert titled "Until The End Warukī, I'm Sorry" was held at Kobe World Memorial Hall.
Watanabe graduated from the group and had her last stage performance on August 9, 2016.

Discography

Solo albums

Solo singles

NMB48 singles

SKE48 singles

AKB48 singles

Appearances

Stage units
NMB48 Kenkyusei Stage 
 
 
NMB48 Team N 1st Stage 
 
 
NMB48 Team N 2nd Stage 
 
 
AKB48 Waiting Stage
 
NMB48 Team N 3rd Stage 
 "Zipper"
 
 
NMB48 Team BII 3rd Stage 
 
SKE48 Team S 3rd Stage 
 
Team Surprise 2nd Stage

TV variety
 AKBingo! (2011–2016 )
 AKB48 to XX (2011-2016)
 NMB48 Geinin! (2012)
 NMB48 Geinin!! 2 (2013)
 NMB48 Geinin!!! 3 (2014)
  (2013)
 NMB48 to Manabukun (2013-2016 )
 SKE48 Ebisho (2014)
 SKE48 Ebicalcio (2014-2015)

TV dramas
 So Long! 3rd Night (2013) 
  (2015), Coby
  (2015), Coby
  Ep.9 - Live Broadcast (2015), Miyu
  Ep. 17 - Comical Love (2016),  Ayaka

Movies
 NMB48 Geinin! The Movie Owarai Seishun Girls! (2013)
 NMB48 Geinin! The Movie Returns Sotsugyou! Owarai Seishun Girls!! Aratanaru Tabidachi (2014)

References

External links
 NMB48 Official Profile 
 Official website on King Record 
Official website on Warner Music Japan  
 Official Blog 

1993 births
Living people
Japanese idols
Japanese women pop singers
Japanese female models
Musicians from Nara Prefecture
NMB48 members
SKE48 members
AKB48 members
21st-century Japanese women singers
21st-century Japanese singers
Warner Music Japan artists